Brian Robert Lawton (born June 29, 1965) is an American former professional ice hockey player, agent and general manager, who played 483 regular season games in the National Hockey League (NHL) between the 1983–84 and 1992–93 seasons. Drafted first overall by the Minnesota North Stars in the 1983 NHL Entry Draft, Lawton played for the North Stars, New York Rangers, Hartford Whalers, Quebec Nordiques, Boston Bruins and San Jose Sharks, and was the Tampa Bay Lightning general manager. He was born in New Brunswick, New Jersey and raised in Cumberland, Rhode Island.

Playing career
After playing for the U.S. Junior Hockey Team at the World Junior Ice Hockey Championships in 1983, and leading his high school, Mount Saint Charles Academy in Woonsocket, Rhode Island, to consecutive championships, Lawton was the first overall draft pick by the North Stars in the 1983 NHL Entry Draft.  Lawton is noted for being the first US-born hockey player drafted first overall in the NHL draft.  He was also the first and, as of 2022, the only US high school hockey player to be drafted first overall.

Lawton was ranked by the NHL Central Scouting Bureau as the top prospect for the 1983 Entry Draft. His NHL career included 266 career points in 483 games. Lawton played his first couple of years in Minnesota, and split his second season between the North Stars and their American Hockey League affiliate, the Springfield Indians. In 1983, Lawton was training with the U.S. National Hockey Team, but unlike other North Stars prospects, Lawton was encouraged to turn professional ahead of the 1984 Winter Olympics, and though he did later play in the 1984 Canada Cup, missed the extra experience playing in Sarajevo would have afforded him. Lawton also later played for the United States team at the 1987 Championships.

Prior to Jesse Puljujärvi and Mikhail Sergachev, Lawton was the only NHL player to ever wear the number 98, which he chose during his rookie season but changed to number 8 after two seasons owing to unwelcome comparisons to Wayne Gretzky's number 99. Lawton set a mark for the North Stars franchise for fastest two goals scored by a rookie, at 19 seconds, in 1983.  After five seasons with Minnesota, Lawton had not scored more than 44 points in any season, and the North Stars apparently washed their hands of him, attempting to assign him to their affiliate in Kalamazoo, Michigan.  When Lawton refused to report, the North Stars traded him to the New York Rangers in October 1988. Halfway through the 1988–89 NHL season, the Rangers traded him again, to Hartford, and Lawton would go on to play in eight different cities over the next four years. Lawton would later say that being moved around as often as he was, was a factor in his performance over the years, and an aspect of the game that he never enjoyed.

Post-playing career
Lawton retired as a player in 1993, after being traded to the New Jersey Devils by San Jose, yet never playing for the Devils. He started his company, Lawton Sport and Financial, right away, and at the time of the company's purchase by Octagon Athlete Representation in 1998, represented 12 players in the NHL.   At times representing players such as Mike Modano, Sergei Fedorov and Ryan Malone, Lawton became Octagon's managing director for hockey, helping Octagon expand their hockey client base and becoming the second-largest hockey agency in the NHL.

Lawton left Octagon in 2008 in order to pursue management opportunities in the NHL, having known since his playing days that he ultimately wanted to be in management.  After interviewing for management positions with a number of teams, caught the attention of then-new Tampa Bay Lightning owners Len Barrie and Oren Koules, by approaching them with a prepared 46-page proposal for how to improve the then-last place team.  On June 25, 2008, Lawton was named Vice President of Hockey Operations for the Lightning, and while Jay Feaster remained in the position of general manager until resigning in July, it was Lawton, along with Koules and Barrie, who were making the decisions. Feaster himself indicated in his official announcement that Lawton had already been running the team with Koules and Barrie. Lawton was officially named as general manager and executive vice president on October 2, 2008.  Among the earliest moves Lawton made with the Tampa organization were hiring Tom Kurvers and Greg Malone to front office positions, and acquiring and signing Gary Roberts and Ryan Malone, the latter of whom is the son of Greg Malone, and was also a client of Lawton's when he was an agent.

Lawton was dismissed as general manager on April 12, 2010 and replaced, on an interim basis, by Tom Kurvers, a Lawton hire. Ultimately, Steve Yzerman, a former client of Lawton's, was named as the new general manager. 

In 2018, Lawton was inducted into the Rhode Island Hockey Hall of Fame. He is currently an on-air analyst for the NHL Network.

He married Angelina Lawton, formerly Angelina Rahn in 1992. They currently reside in Minneapolis, Minnesota and have three children. Angelina is the CEO of sports/tech agency, Sportsdigita.

Career statistics

Regular season and playoffs

International

References

External links
Brian Lawton's hockeydraftcentral.com bio
Brian Lawton's legendsofhockey bio

1965 births
Living people
American men's ice hockey left wingers
Boston Bruins players
Hartford Whalers players
Ice hockey people from New Jersey
Ice hockey people from Rhode Island
Kansas City Blades players
Minnesota North Stars draft picks
Minnesota North Stars players
National Hockey League first-overall draft picks
National Hockey League first-round draft picks
New York Rangers players
People from Cumberland, Rhode Island
Sportspeople from New Brunswick, New Jersey
Phoenix Roadrunners (IHL) players
Quebec Nordiques players
San Jose Sharks players
Tampa Bay Lightning executives
Mount Saint Charles Academy alumni
Ice hockey players from Rhode Island
Ice hockey players from New Jersey